Waikikamukau (as if saying "Why kick a moo cow") is a generic name for a small rural town or locality in New Zealand. New Zealanders use the name as a placeholder name for "any town" or to denote a non-specific but remote rural town.  It has a similar connotation to the New Zealand slang Wop Wops
and the Australian term Woop Woop and other appellations such as the "Boondocks" or "Timbuktu". The name is a joking reference to the frequency of New Zealand place names starting with "Wai" (Māori for water, and used in the names of many rivers and nearby towns).

Waikikamukau is reputed to specifically refer to the town of Waipukurau in the North Island.  The origins are hazy but one account is that the American servicemen stationed in NZ during the Second World War found it difficult to pronounce the place name and thus jokingly called it Waikikamukau.  However the name has been in use at least since 1930.

It was used as the name of a successful racehorse in the 1990s.

Waikikamukau was also used as the setting for a Nickelodeon telemovie, Rocket Power: Race Across New Zealand.

See also
Māori language
 Māori influence on New Zealand English

References

Geography of New Zealand
New Zealand culture
Fictional populated places
New Zealand slang
Placeholder names
Rural culture in Oceania